Illinois Route 155 is an east–west state highway in southwestern Illinois. It runs from Fort de Chartres – outside of Prairie du Rocher – to Illinois Route 3 in Ruma.

Route description 

Illinois 155 serves as a spur from Illinois Route 3 through Prairie du Rocher and on to Fort de Chartres.  It is recognized as a spur of the Great River Road. It is also part of the Lincoln Heritage Trail. Illinois 155 is a two-lane road from Fort de Chartres all the way to Illinois 3.

History 
Illinois Route 155 was established in 1924 with the second batch of SBI routes. Its route has not changed since 1924.

Major intersections

References

External links 

155
Transportation in Randolph County, Illinois